The University of St. Francis is a private Franciscan university with its main campus in Joliet, Illinois. It enrolls more than 3,900 students at locations throughout the country with about 1,300 students at its main campus.

History
The University of St. Francis grew out of an earlier high school and Sisters’ Normal Institute (an institution created to train high school graduates to be teachers) by the Congregation of the Sisters of St Francis of Mary Immaculate established on August 2, 1865 by Mother Alfred Moes. By 1869, a boarding school for high school girls opened in Joliet called the St. Francis Academy. The Institute became a college: The Sisters’ Normal Institute of Higher Learning, in 1920.

The institute became Assisi Junior College, a two-year junior college, in 1925. Mother M. Thomasine Frye, OSF served as first president with an enrollment of 12 students and 8 teachers. In 1930, the school was reorganized with a full college curriculum as the College of St. Francis with bachelor's degree granting authority. In 1935, the all-female college began an affiliation with the St. Joseph Hospital School of Nursing – to create the St. Francis College of Nursing.

During the Second World War, new programs in science and Spanish were added and in 1945 a student-run radio station, WCSF, was established on campus.

In 1962 Sr. Anita Marie Jochem, OSF, was named the college's fourth president and the last congregational Sister President.  The college officially incorporated as its own institution, separate from the congregation, with its own charter and by-laws. The college became coeducational in 1971 and the next year saw the beginning of athletic programs.

The school became the University of St. Francis in 1998, the same year the school began offering online courses and degree programs. In 2000, the university received doctoral degree granting authority and by 2004 was organized in five colleges; College of Arts & Sciences, College of Business & Health Administration, College of Education, College of Nursing and Health Professions, and College of Professional Studies.

In 2013 Dr. Arvid Johnson became the university's ninth president and the university's first overseas graduate program was established with Brno University of Technology in the Czech Republic.
The university's St. Bonaventure Campus opened in downtown Joliet with additional classrooms, offices, and a business incubator. In 2016, Guardian Angel Hall opened to students at St. Clare Campus, located at 1550 Plainfield Road (about one mile from the main campus) as the home to the USF Leach College of Nursing.

In 2018 new construction was completed on the LaVerne & Dorothy Brown Science Hall on the main campus. The university has begun planning for centennial celebrations in 2020.

The University also offers a Physician Assistant program at a second campus site in Albuquerque, New Mexico.

The university has a total enrollment of 4,166 (2018) and an undergraduate enrollment of 1,599. (Men: 34.6% Women: 65.4%)USF website Facts & Figures page

Colleges and schools 
 College of Arts and Sciences
 College of Business and Health Administration
 College of Education
 Leach College of Nursing

Athletics 
The St. Francis (USF) athletic teams are called the Fighting Saints. The university is a member of the National Association of Intercollegiate Athletics (NAIA) and is part of the Chicagoland Collegiate Athletic Conference (CCAC) for most of its sports since the 1973–74 academic year; while its football team competes in the Midwest League of the Mid-States Football Association (MSFA).

USF competes in 20 intercollegiate varsity sports: Men's sports include baseball, basketball, bowling, cross country, football, golf, soccer, tennis and track & field; while women's sports include basketball, bowling, cross country, dance, golf, soccer, softball, tennis, track & field and volleyball; and co-ed sports include cheerleading.

History 
 1972 – USF begins men's intercollegiate athletics (when known as CSF).
 1972 – Elmer Bell becomes the first full-time athletic director and CSF starts its first athletic programs – baseball and men's basketball. Both teams employ the nickname “Falcons”.
 1972 – Nationally recognized USF man's marathon running team
 1973 – Men's cross country becomes CSF's third athletic program.
 1975 – CSF becomes the "Fighting Saints."
 1976 – Women's basketball, men's tennis, women's tennis and women's volleyball intercollegiate athletics programs start.
 1979 – CSF adds men's golf and softball to its growing list of sports.
 1982 – CSF men's soccer and women's cross country begin competition. 
 1986 – A recreation center constructed for the athletic program and the men's football program created. Tower Hall deeded to CSF.
 1987 – Cheerleading added to the list of CSF sports.
 1993 – CSF's baseball team claims the school's first-ever NAIA World Series national championship. Head coach Gordie Gillespie becomes college baseball's all-time winningest coach. 
 1995 – The USF athletic department adds women's soccer. 
 2000 – Women's golf and women's track & field programs started.  
 2007 – USF athletics adds men's track & field. 
 2012 – Men's cross country wins NAIA National Championship. 
 2012 – The recreation center is renamed the “Pat Sullivan Center” in recognition of Sullivan, a long-time basketball coach and athletic director. 
 2013 – USF men and women's bowling begins competition.
 2016 – Competitive dance becomes USF's 22nd sport.
 2017 – USF women's bowling team wins the NAIA Invitational in its fourth season of competition.
 2020 – USF women's cross country team wins the NAIA National Championship.
 2021 – USF men's bowling team wins the NAIA Championship.

Notable alumni 

Jon Debus, professional baseball player and coach
Mike Feminis, college football coach
Natalie Manley, member of Illinois House of Representatives
Jennifer Bertino-Tarrant, Illinois State Senator
Pat McGuire, Illinois State Senator
Steve Parris, professional baseball player
Mike Wessel, former football player, current Mixed Martial Artist for Bellator fighting championships
Nikki Woods, radio producer, Tom Joyner Morning Show

References

External links
 Official website
 Official athletics website

 
Franciscan universities and colleges
University of Saint Francis
Association of Catholic Colleges and Universities
Educational institutions established in 1920
Former women's universities and colleges in the United States
Roman Catholic Diocese of Joliet in Illinois
Catholic universities and colleges in Illinois
1920 establishments in Illinois